"Should've Known Better" is a hit song written, composed, and performed by American rock singer Richard Marx.  It was released in September 1987 as the second single from his Triple Platinum-selling self-titled debut album. The song peaked at number three on the US Billboard Hot 100 as well as #7 on the Billboard Mainstream Rock Tracks chart in 1987 and #4 on the Radio & Records CHR/Pop Airplay chart.

Marx became the first solo artist in recording history to reach the top three of the Billboard Hot 100 with four singles from a debut album.

In the lyrics, the speaker is still in love with an ex-lover and tortured by it, to the point of regretting falling in love with her.

The music video for the selection was directed by Dominic Sena.

Personnel 
 Richard Marx – lead and backing vocals
 Tom Keane – keyboards
 Michael Landau – guitars
 John Pierce – bass
 Prairie Prince – drums
 Paulinho da Costa – percussion
 Fee Waybill – backing vocals

Chart performance
Released in September 1987 as the second single from his debut solo album, "Should've Known Better" entered the U.S. Billboard Hot 100 on September 26, 1987 at number 64, the highest debut of the week. 
The single also peaked at number 20 on the U.S. Adult Contemporary chart. The song also reached #4 on the Radio & Records CHR/Pop Airplay chart on November 20, 1987 for two weeks and remained on the chart for 13 weeks.
Elsewhere, the single reached number 50 in the United Kingdom.

Charts

Year-end charts

References

1987 singles
Richard Marx songs
Songs written by Richard Marx
Music videos directed by Dominic Sena
Manhattan Records singles